The 2002–03 season saw Leeds United compete in the Premier League (known as the Barclaycard Premiership for sponsorship reasons).

Season summary

When Terry Venables was appointed as manager, much was expected at Leeds as Venables had previously brought success to Tottenham and Barcelona before taking England to the semi-finals of Euro 96. But the looming debt Leeds were now facing meant they couldn't keep star defender Rio Ferdinand, who was sold to Manchester United for £30 million. After the season began, striker Robbie Keane was also sold to Tottenham. Despite the rough start, Leeds began well, as back to back wins over Newcastle and Manchester United put Leeds top after 6 games. But a 1–4 loss to Arsenal, and later 0–1 to Liverpool, saw their form begin to drop. Leeds were then embarrassingly knocked out of the League Cup by Sheffield United, and despite wins in the UEFA Cup Leeds' spiraling debts meant manager Terry Venables was forced to sell more top players. Lee Bowyer and midfielder Olivier Dacourt soon left the club, and over time defenders Danny Mills and Jonathan Woodgate, as well as striker Robbie Fowler, were all sold. In the league, Leeds were losing consecutive games to Bolton, Charlton and Fulham and slipping towards the relegation zone. A 1-2 home defeat to Málaga also knocked them out of the UEFA Cup (Leeds' last appearance in European competition to date). Pressure was mounting on Venables, although this was eased by New Year's Day as Leeds took 13 points from 15 over the holiday season, a run which included 16-year-old James Milner scoring in consecutive games to secure wins against Sunderland and Chelsea, becoming the youngest scorer in Premiership history in the process (this record was later broken by James Vaughan in 2005). Defender Matthew Kilgallon and midfielder Frazer Richardson were also given debuts. Leeds reached the quarter-finals of the FA Cup, but were again knocked out by Sheffield United. Venables, frustrated at the continued selling of key players, quit the club, and former Manchester City and Sunderland boss Peter Reid was appointed with 8 games left. With a 1-6 thrashing of Charlton, a 2–0 win over Fulham, and then later a 3–2 victory against Arsenal which, just as in 1999, ended the Gunners' title hopes, Mark Viduka in fantastic form saved the club from relegation. Leeds finished in 15th place, however only days after the season ended, star striker Harry Kewell also left the club. With these accumulated departures, and finances still not under control, the worst was yet to come for Leeds United.

Final league table

Kit
Nike remained as Leeds United's kit sponsors, and introduced a new home kit for the season.

First-team squad

Left club during season

Reserve squad

Statistics

Appearances and goals

|-
! colspan=14 style=background:#dcdcdc; text-align:center| Goalkeepers

|-
! colspan=14 style=background:#dcdcdc; text-align:center| Defenders

|-
! colspan=14 style=background:#dcdcdc; text-align:center| Midfielders

|-
! colspan=14 style=background:#dcdcdc; text-align:center| Forwards

|-
! colspan=14 style=background:#dcdcdc; text-align:center| Players transferred out during the season

Results

Premier League

Results by round

FA Cup

League Cup

UEFA Cup

First round

Leeds United won 2–1 on aggregate

Second round

Leeds United won 5–1 on aggregate.

Third round

Málaga won 2–1 on aggregate.

Transfers

In

Out

Loaned in

Loaned out

References

Leeds United
Leeds United F.C. seasons
Foot